Estadio Hermanos Serdán is a stadium in Puebla City, Mexico. It is primarily used for baseball, and is the home field of the Pericos de Puebla of the Mexican League. It holds 9,723 people. It is named to honor the Serdán brothers (Aquiles, Carmen, Máximo and Natalia), Pueblan politicians and supporters of the Mexican Revolution.

Home of Pericos de Puebla Mexican League baseball team since 1973, also when the club was known as Angeles Negros and Ángeles de Puebla and recently it has been the home of Tigres de la Angelópolis from 2002 to 2006, when they left the city of Puebla to move to Cancún, Quintana Roo.

The stadium was inaugurated on 16 June 1973 with the first ball thrown by the governor of the city at that time Guillermo Morales Blumenkron, accompanied by the commissioner of the league Alejo Peralta. In that first game Pericos de Puebla defeated Piratas de Sabinas 6–0.

History
It was 2 in the afternoon on July 16, 1973, when the governor of Puebla Lic. Guillermo Morales Blumenkron threw the first pitch accompanied by the municipal president Luis Vázquez Lapuente and the commissioner Alejo Peralta y Díaz Ceballos, along with the owners of the club Emilio Tame y William Budib with  Enrique Montero Ponce who was an important person in the construction of the stadium and who help the city financially.

That day the home club Pericos de Puebla under the management of Tomás Herrera faced the Piratas de Sabinas in a 4-game series in which the first when to the home team with a victory of 6–0. The first victory pitched by Arnulfo Adame was the first in the stadium history the first loss went to Francisco Rivas. Teolindo Acosta was the first player to get a hit in the park Francisco Castro  was the first player to score the first run.

The stadium has seen five league finals in its history two by Ángeles de Puebla in 1979 and in 1986 (As Angeles Negros), in 2010, in 2014, also one by Tigres de la Angelópolis in 2005 the five finales were owned by the local team. On 14 May 1987, the stadium held its first all-star game number 50 between the Selección Sur (South Division) and the Selección del Norte (North Division). Pitchers for the south were Jesús "Chito" Ríos,  followed by Herminio Domínguez, Fredy Arroyo and the closer  Salomé Barojas. North division pitchers were  Adolfo Navarro, followed by the lefty Isidro Morales, Jesús Moreno,  Fernández Fuson,  Martín Kaine,  Antonio Pulido  and  Ezequiel Cano. The loss went to  Adolfo Navarro; the most valuable player award went to Jesús "Chuchín" González.

Concert events
Aside from baseball games several other events have been held in the stadium over the years.
Maná – 29 February 2008
Julieta Venegas – 8 November 2008
Tiësto – December 10, 2008
Los Tigres del Norte – November 13, 2009
Internacional Festival de Puebla – 15–16 November 2009
WWE SmackDown – 16 October 2009 and May 7, 2010
Guerra de Titanes – 16 December 2011

See also
 Gimnasio Miguel Hidalgo – basketball arena in Puebla
 Estadio Cuauhtémoc – association football stadium in Puebla

References

External links
 
 World Stadiums entry

Estadio de Beisbol Hermanos Serdan
Hermanos Serdan
Estadio de Beisbol Hermanos Serdan
Sports venues completed in 1973
Sports venues in Puebla
Mexican League ballparks